Aaronsohnia factorovskyi is a member of the daisy family and is found from central Israel to Iraq and Arabian Peninsula, the bulb part tastes like chesnuts when cooked .

References

Anthemideae
Flora of the Arabian Peninsula
Taxa named by Otto Warburg